Hold That Camera is an American game show that ran on the DuMont Television Network's primetime schedule from August 27 to December 15, 1950. The series aired on Fridays at 8:30 PM Eastern.

Originally a game show hosted by Jimmy Blaine (1924-1967), after the first few episodes the format was completely overhauled into a variety show with Kyle MacDonnell as host. MacDonnell (1922-2004) was named "Miss Television 1948" by Time magazine. The orchestra leader was Ving Merlin.

Episode status
Two episodes are known to exist: October 20, held by the J. Fred MacDonald collection at the Library of Congress and December 1, held by the Paley Center for Media.

See also
 List of programs broadcast by the DuMont Television Network
 List of surviving DuMont Television Network broadcasts
 1950-51 United States network television schedule

References

 David Weinstein, The Forgotten Network: DuMont and the Birth of American Television (Philadelphia: Temple University Press, 2004) 
 Alex McNeil, Total Television, Fourth edition (New York: Penguin Books, 1980) 
 Tim Brooks and Earle Marsh, The Complete Directory to Prime Time Network TV Shows, Third edition (New York: Ballantine Books, 1964)

External links
 Hold That Camera at IMDB
 Kyle MacDonnell: TV’s Forgotten Star at Television Obscurities

DuMont Television Network original programming
1950s American game shows
1950 American television series debuts
1950 American television series endings
Black-and-white American television shows
Lost television shows